CDZ, CdZ, or cdz may refer to:

 CdZ, Chief of Civil Administration, civil administrative division in Nazi Germany
 CDZ, Toronto Stock Exchange code for Claymore CDN Dividend & Income Achievers ETF
 Chidarzai railway station (station code CDZ), Pakistan
 Clean driving zone, an area within an industrial plant for the maintenance of logistic transport vehicles
 Convergence-divergence zone, a theory to explain the neural mechanisms of memory and recollection
 Controlled Drinking Zone, an area in London where police officers can require a person to stop drinking
 Koda language (ISO 639-3 Language code cdz) native to India and Bangladesh
 Neo Geo CDZ, a video game console